This is the full list of ranks and rates used in the Russian Federation.

Military ranks 
 Deck ranks are used by:
 Ministry of Defense
 Navy — Deck personnel only
 Federal Security Service (FSB)
 Russian FSB Coast Guard
 National Guard (FSVNG)
 National Guard Naval Service Corps
 Troop ranks are used by:
 Ministry of Defense
 Aerospace Forces
 Air Force
 Space Forces
 Aerospace Defense Forces
 Ground Forces
 Navy — Naval Infantry, Naval Aviation, Coastal Defense troops, Medical Service, and over-shore services
 Air-Borne Assault Troops
 Strategic Rocket Forces
 Other services and service support forces directly under the Armed Forces and the Ministry of Defence
 National Guard (FSVNG)
 National Guard Forces Command
 Federal Security Service (FSB)
 Federal Security Service by itself
 Border Troops of the FSB
 Federal Protective Service (FSO)
 includes the Kremlin Regiment (KP)
 Foreign Intelligence Service (SVR)
 Ministry of Emergency Situations (MChS / EMERCOM)
 Civil Defense troops
 Military Personnel of the State Firefighting Service
 Military Prosecution — under the Office of the Prosecutor General of Russia — not under the Ministry of Defense.
 Military Judges of Military Courts — military courts are part of the Unified Judicial System of Russia and subordinate to the Supreme Court of the Russian Federation (which has a military colleague) — not under the Ministry of Defense; there are also civilian judges in military courts.

Every military service that is not directly maritime (including shore services of the Navy) uses troop ranks.

Special ranks 
 Special ranks of Police are used by:
 Russian Police (under Ministry of Internal Affairs)
 Main Directorate for Drugs Control (Ministry of Internal Affairs)
 Special ranks of justice are used by:
 Investigative Committee of Russia (not to be confused with military ranks of military prosecutors and military judges)
 Special ranks of internal service are used by:
 Federal Migration Service (under Ministry of Internal Affairs)
 other uniformed services of Ministry of Internal Affairs (passport desks, medical service of ministry, etc.)
 Federal Prison Service (under Ministry of Justice)
 Federal Bailiffs Service (under Ministry of Justice)
 State Firefighting Service (under Ministry of Emergency Situations) (apart from military personnel of the service which use military ranks)
 State Courier Service (Russia)
 Special rank of customs service
 Federal Customs Service of Russia

Class rates 

Class rates are used by different federal ministries and agencies of Russia. Some of them use common State Civil Service class rates while others (like the Ministry of Justice and the State Prosecution Service) use specialized class rates. Some municipal organizations also use class rates.

Table of ranks

Sources
 Федеральный закон "О воинской обязанности и военной службе" от 28.03.1998 N 53-ФЗ 2013-11-03
 Указ Президента РФ от 7 июня 2011 г. N 720 "О внесении изменений в некоторые акты Президента Российской Федерации" 2013-11-03

See also 
 History of Russian military ranks

Military ranks of Russia
Civil service ranks in the Russian Federation
Police ranks